Israeli Wrestling League (IWL) (Rabitat al-musaraeat al-israyiylia), is an Israeli professional wrestling promotion founded in 2013 by Eitan Levy & Lidor Bushary. Its first show was in May 2013 during the filming of the wrestling season in the fourth season of HaYafa VeHaChnun, the Israeli version of Beauty and the Geek. The wrestling academy, led by Lidor Bushary, opened in May 2014 in Rehovot at the Alternative Sports Center, where performances are held every two month. The IWL has one belt, the IWL Heavyweight Championship. As of 2016, the IWL does not pay their wrestlers, in order to keep costs down.

Wrestling academy

The league runs the largest wrestling academy in Israel, led by Lidor Bushary, a fitness and coaching coach and professional wrestling coach, the first in Israel to be certified by the Wingate Institute.

The Academy also has their own shows, albeit smaller than the Main Roster with mainly trainees family and friends in attendance.

IWL Academy 3

IWL Academy 4

IWL Academy 5

IWL special events
The IWL events feature professional wrestling matches that involve different wrestlers from pre-existing scripted feuds and storylines. Wrestlers portrayed villains, heroes, or less distinguishable characters in the scripted events that built tension and culminated in a wrestling match or series of matches.

IWL I - IWL vs. Hayafa Veachnon

The inaugural performance of the IWL was held on 8 May 2013 at Meimad Studios in Ramat Hahayal in Tel Aviv, as a special episode HaYafa VeHaChnun, the Israeli version of Beauty and the Geek.

IWL II

On 13 October 2014, IWL put on their second show, IWL II, their first independent show. It was held at Mabuza Hall in Rehovot and drew 140 people.

IWL III

On 17 November 2014, IWL put on their third show, IWL III. It was held at Mabuza Hall in Rehovot and drew 125 people.

IWL IV

On 5 May 2015, IWL put on their fourth show, IWL IV. It was held at Mabuza Hall in Rehovot and drew 110 people.

IWL V

On 1 June 2015, IWL put on their fifth show, IWL V. It was held at Mabuza Hall in Rehovot and drew 90 people.

IWL VI

On 17 August 2015, IWL put on their sixth show, IWL VI. It was held at Mabuza Hall in Rehovot and drew 160 people.

IWL VII

On 12 October 2015, IWL put on their seventh show, IWL VII. It was held at Mabuza Hall in Rehovot and drew 150 people.

IWL VIII

On 14 December 2015, IWL put on their either show, IWL VIII. It was held at Mabuza Hall in Rehovot and drew 160 people.

IWL IX

On 14 March 2016, IWL put on their ninth show, IWL IX. It was held at Mabuza Hall in Rehovot and drew 160 people.

IWL X

On 25 April 2016, IWL put on their tenth show, IWL X. It was held at Mabuza Hall in Rehovot and drew 190 people.

IWL XI

On 1 August 2016, IWL put on their eleventh show, IWL XI. It was held at Mabuza Hall in Rehovot and drew 130 people.

IWL XII

On 3 January 2017, IWL put on their twelfth show, IWL XII. It was held at Mabuza Hall in Petah Tikva, their first show at the newly relocated hall. The main match of the evening was a 20-man battle royal to determine the #1 contender for the IWL Heavyweight Championship.

IWL XIII

On 14 February 2017, IWL put on their thirteenth show, IWL XIII. It was held at Mabuza Hall in Petah Tikva.

IWL XIV

On 6 April 2017, IWL put on their fourteenth show, IWL XIV. It was held at Mabuza Hall in Petah Tikva.

Rage Megashow - IWL/LAW Main Show

On 9 July 2017 The Rage Megashow, was jointly produced by IWL and Los Angeles Wrestling, in an event that drew close to a 1,000 people. It took the Drive-In Arena in Tel Aviv hosted the largest wrestling show in Israel in over 20 years, known as the Rage Megashow. The show featured the return of Kevin Von Erich (with his sons Ross and Marshall) Tatanka and Marty Jannetty to Israel. Other international stars included Bad Bones, David Starr, and Jurn Simmons. Four of the matches at the Rage Megashow included IWL wrestlers.

IWL XV

On 24 August 2017, IWL put on their fifteenth show, IWL XV. It was held at Mabuza Hall in Petah Tikva, and drew 130 people.

IWL XVI

On 8 October 2017, IWL put on their sixteenth show, IWL XVI. It was held at Mabuza Hall in Petah Tikva, and drew 140 people.

IWL XVII

On 13 December 2017, IWL put on their seventeenth show, IWL XVII. It was held at Mabuza Hall in Petah Tikva, and drew 160 people. In November 2017, the IWL announced that Ross Von Erich and Marshall Von Erich will both be wrestling at IWL XVII.

IWL XVIII

On 22 March 2018, IWL put on their eighteenth show, IWL XVIII. It was held at Mabuza Hall in Petah Tikva, and drew 130 people.

IWL XIX

On 27 June 2018, IWL put on their nineteenth show, IWL XIX. It was held at Mabuza Hall in Petah Tikva.

IWL XX

On 26 August 2018, IWL put on their twentieth show, IWL XX. It was held at Mabuza Hall in Petah Tikva, and drew 170 people.

IWL Heavyweight Championship

See also
 Professional wrestling in Israel

References

Israeli professional wrestling promotions
2013 establishments in Israel
Organizations established in 2013
Organizations based in Netanya